The 2015 Aegon Ilkley Trophy was a professional tennis tournament played on outdoor grass courts. It was the first edition of the tournament and part of the 2015 ATP Challenger Tour and 2015 ITF Women's Circuit, offering a total of €42,500 (ATP) and $50,000+H (ITF) in prize money. It took place in Ilkley, United Kingdom, on 15–21 June 2015.

Men's singles main draw entrants

Seeds 

 1 Rankings as of 8 June 2015

Other entrants 
The following players received wildcards into the singles main draw:
  Luke Bambridge
  Joshua Milton
  Cameron Norrie
  Marcus Willis

The following players received entry as a special exempt into the singles main draw:
  Matthew Ebden

The following players used protected entry to gain entry into the singles main draw:
  Ante Pavić

The following players received entry as an alternate into the singles main draw:
  Yoshihito Nishioka

The following players received entry from the qualifying draw:
  Mirza Bašić
  Alex Bolt
  Luke Saville
  Grega Žemlja

Women's singles main draw entrants

Seeds 

 1 Rankings as of 8 June 2015

Other entrants 
The following players received wildcards into the singles main draw:
  Jodie Anna Burrage
  Katy Dunne
  Tara Moore
  Gabriella Taylor

The following players received entry from the qualifying draw:
  Verónica Cepede Royg
  Stéphanie Foretz
  Anett Kontaveit
  Tamira Paszek

Champions

Men's singles

 Denis Kudla def.  Matthew Ebden, 6–3, 6–4

Women's singles

 Anna-Lena Friedsam def.  Magda Linette, 5–7, 6–3, 6–1

Men's doubles

 Marcus Daniell /  Marcelo Demoliner def.  Ken Skupski /  Neal Skupski, 7–6(7–3), 6–4

Women's doubles

 Raluca Olaru /  Xu Yifan def.  An-Sophie Mestach /  Demi Schuurs, 6–3, 6–4

External links 
 2015 Aegon Ilkley Trophy at ITFtennis.com
 Official website

2015 ITF Women's Circuit
2015 ATP Challenger Tour
2015
June 2015 sports events in the United Kingdom
2015 in English tennis